Joao Fernandes may refer to:
 João Fernandes (explorer), Portuguese explorer of the 15th century
 João Pedro Matos Fernandes (born 1967), Portuguese politician
 João Fernandes (footballer, born 1983), Portuguese footballer
 João Paulo Fernandes (boccia) (born 1984), Portuguese Paralympic boccia player
 João Paulo Fernandes (footballer)
 João Fernandes Lavrador (1453–1505), Portuguese explorer of the late 15th century
 João Fernandes (motorcyclist) (born 1977), Grand Prix motorcycle racer from Portugal
 João Fernandes (cinematographer), cinematographer also known as Raoul Lomas
 João Fernandes (rower) (born 1976), Portuguese Olympic rower
 João Fernandes (footballer, born 2000), Portuguese footballer